Wu Yen is a 2001 historical Hong Kong comedy film produced and directed by Johnnie To and Wai Ka-Fai.

Cast and roles
 Anita Mui - Emperor Qi(King Xuan of Qi)/Emperor Qi's Ancestor(Duke Huan of Qi)
 Sammi Cheng - Chung Wu Yen
 Cecilia Cheung - Enchantress/Xia Yinchun
 Ai Wai		
 Joe Cheng		
 Chun Wong - Emperor of Qin
 Hui Shiu Hung - Emperor of Chu
 Lam Suet - Prime Minister An
 Lung Tin Sang - Historian
 Siu Leung		
 Wang Tian-lin (credited as Tin Lam Wong)
 Raymond Wong Ho-Yin - Ng Hei
 Wong Man-Wai

External links
 

2000s Cantonese-language films
2001 films
Films set in the Warring States period
2001 comedy films
China Star Entertainment Group films
Milkyway Image films
Films directed by Johnnie To
Films with screenplays by Wai Ka-fai
Films directed by Wai Ka-Fai
Hong Kong comedy films
2000s Hong Kong films